Judson Lincoln Transue (February 15, 1897 – December 17, 1980) was a Michigan politician.

Political life
He was elected as the Mayor of City of Flint in 1924 for three 1 year terms.  Transue was supported by the Ku Klux Klan, who mounted A recall effort of his predecessor, Cuthbertson, for his appointment of a Catholic Police Chief, James P. Cole.  Despite the KKK's support, he kept Cole on as police chief.

References

Mayors of Flint, Michigan
1897 births
1980 deaths
People from Wayne County, New York
20th-century American politicians